Derrick Ralph Adkins (born July 2, 1970) is a former American track and field athlete who specialized in the 400-meter hurdles. He was an Olympic gold medalist in that event at the 1996 Summer Olympics and World Champion at the 1995 World Championships in Athletics. He was the fastest man in the world in the 1994 and 1996 seasons and holds a personal record of 47.54 seconds. Adkins was a two-time national champion at the USA Outdoor Track and Field Championships.

A Georgia Institute of Technology alumnus, he won back-to-back gold medals at the Summer Universiade from 1991 to 1993. He was also a gold medalist at the 1994 Goodwill Games and the 1996 IAAF Grand Prix Final. He represented the United States four times at the World Championships in Athletics, also reaching the final in 1991 and 1993.

Following his competitive retirement he remained connected with the sport and served as director of The Armory Track and Field Center between 2006 and 2011.

Biography

Early life
Born in Brooklyn, New York, Adkins was raised in Lakeview, New York in Long Island where he attended Malverne High School, graduating in 1988. That year he was ranked as the number one high school 400-meter hurdler in the nation, having run the race in 50.71 seconds. He attended Georgia Tech where he earned a bachelor's degree at the George W. Woodruff School of Mechanical Engineering in June 1993. Coached by Buddy Fowlkes and Grover Hinsdale at Georgia Tech, he became a six-time All American in the 400-meter hurdles and in the 4×400-meter relay.

His first international success was a gold medal double in the 400 m hurdles and 4 × 400-meter relay at the 1989 Pan American Junior Athletics Championships.

Senior career

Adkins reached his first senior global final at the 1991 World Championships in Athletics, placed sixth overall. He returned two years later at the 1993 World Championships in Athletics, ending in seventh on that occasion. His first major title followed at the 1994 Goodwill Games in Saint Petersburg, where he ran a games record time of 47.86 seconds to claim the gold. Adkins was runner-up to Samuel Matete at the 1994 IAAF Grand Prix Final that year.

At the 1995 World Championships in Goteborg, Sweden, Adkins won the gold narrowly ahead of his career long rival Samuel Matete from Zambia in a time of 47.98 seconds. In the beginning of the 1996 season Matete beat Adkins four times in a row. Then just before the Games in Atlanta, Adkins defeated Matete in the Paris Grand Prix at the Stade de France in a time of 47.70.

At the Olympic Games in Atlanta, Adkins won the gold medal in a time of 47.54, beating Matete by 0.24 seconds.

In his career Adkins broke the 48-second barrier 20 times. He is one of the few hurdlers who have won back-to-back gold medals in the World Championships and Olympic Games. He was a two-time USA National Champion in 1994 and 1995. He was a two-time winner of the Weltklasse Zurich meet, having won the 1995 meet in a time of 47.65 seconds. He was a two-time winner of the Millrose Games in the 500 meters having run 1:01.71 at Madison Square Garden. He has set stadium records and meet records at the Penn Relays, the Lucerne Grand Prix (47.68), the Linz Grand Prix (47.70), and the Goodwill Games in St. Petersburg, Russia (47.86).

He ceased to compete internationally after 2000 and made his last appearance at the national championships in 2004, pulling up in the heats of the 400 m hurdles.

Post-competitive career
In October 1996 local authorities of his hometown of Lakeview lobbied to change the name of the street where he was raised, from Seneca Road to Derrick Adkins Lane.

Adkins served as an assistant track & field coach at Columbia University between 2004 and 2006. While coaching at Columbia his athletes set seven school records, and won six Ivy League individual-event championships.

Adkins served as director of The Armory Track and Field Center between 2006 and 2011. During his time at The Armory the organization began hosting more than 100 track meets per year. He was influential in the decision to bring the Millrose Games from Madison Square Garden to The Armory where it continues to be staged annually.

At the Armory Track & Field Center, Adkins also served as the Director of Armory College Prep, a college readiness program which served the student-athletes who attended the center. Students were provided college counseling services, academic tutoring, and SAT preparation instruction.

He was inducted into the Nassau County Sports Hall of Fame in 2009.

Personal issues
In 2009, Adkins was arrested for driving while intoxicated. He admits to having suffered a long-term battle with clinical depression and alcohol addiction.

In 2013, Adkins was arrested for obstruction of governmental administration in Long Beach, New York. The charges were dismissed. The initial charge was that he was running and walking in the wrong lanes on a boardwalk. In court, it was revealed that there were never any lanes on the boardwalk. The arresting officer never appeared in court. The Nassau County Public Corruption Bureau investigated the case and thereafter issued a written admonishment to the Long Beach Police Department.

On December 17, 2022 the New York Times published an article wherein Adkins states that his depression emerged from head injuries which he had experienced as an athlete due to hurdle collisions.

Personal records
Outdoor
100-meter dash – 10.48 (1994)
400-meter dash – 46.42 (1997)
110-meter hurdles – 13.69 (1992)
400-meter hurdles – 47.54 (1995)

Indoor
400-meter dash – 46.37 (1994)
500-meter dash – 1:01.70 (1995)
60-meter hurdles – 8.22 (1998)

Season's bests
Rankings from Track and Field Statistics

International competitions

National titles
USA Outdoor Track and Field Championships
400 m hurdles: 1994, 1995

Circuit wins
Weltklasse Zürich: 1994, 1995, 1996
Bislett Games: 1994, 1996
DN Galan: 1994
Athletissima: 1994
Spitzen Leichtathletik Luzern: 1994, 1995
Meeting de Paris: 1995, 1996
Znamenskiy Memorial: 1995
London Grand Prix: 1995
Herculis: 1995
Memorial Van Damme: 1996
Osaka Grand Prix: 1997

See also
List of Olympic medalists in athletics (men)
List of World Championships in Athletics medalists (men)
List of 1996 Summer Olympics medal winners
400 metres hurdles at the Olympics
400 metres hurdles at the World Championships in Athletics
List of male hurdlers
List of Georgia Institute of Technology athletes

References

External links
 
 USATF bio
 

1970 births
Living people
Sportspeople from Brooklyn
Track and field athletes from New York City
American male hurdlers
Olympic male sprinters
Olympic gold medalists for the United States in track and field
Athletes (track and field) at the 1996 Summer Olympics
Medalists at the 1996 Summer Olympics
Universiade medalists in athletics (track and field)
Goodwill Games medalists in athletics
World Athletics Championships medalists
World Athletics Championships athletes for the United States
Georgia Tech Yellow Jackets men's track and field athletes
Universiade gold medalists for the United States
World Athletics Championships winners
Medalists at the 1991 Summer Universiade
Medalists at the 1993 Summer Universiade
Malverne High School alumni
Competitors at the 1994 Goodwill Games
20th-century American people